The Amaury Sport Organisation (ASO and also A.S.O.) is a private company, founded in 1992, that is part of the privately-owned French media group Éditions Philippe Amaury (EPA). ASO organises the Tour de France and other cycling races, as well as golf, running, sailing and off-road motorsport events over 250 days of competition per year, with 90 events in 30 countries. The president of ASO is Jean-Etienne Amaury, the son of Philippe Amaury and Marie-Odile Amaury, and grandson of EPA founder, Émilien Amaury.

Cycling

The Tour de France was instituted by the newspaper L'Auto in 1903. The paper was closed after World War II because of its links with the occupying Germans and a new paper, L'Équipe, took over. L'Équipe organised the Tour and in 1965 the newspaper was acquired by Émilien Amaury. L'Équipe organised the race until it was taken over by its parent company, ASO. , ASO claimed to be the world leader in bicycle race organisation with 132 days of competition each year.

Current
 ASO organises the following cycling events:

 UCI World Tour

 Critérium du Dauphiné
 Eschborn–Frankfurt
 La Flèche Wallonne
 Liège–Bastogne–Liège
 Paris–Nice
 Paris–Roubaix
 Tour de France
 Volta a Catalunya
 Vuelta a España (alongside Unipublic)

 UCI Continental Circuits

 Arctic Race of Norway
 Paris–Tours
 Tour du Faso
 Tour of Oman
 Deutschland Tour
 Tour of Saudi Arabia
 Tour of Yorkshire

 Women's

 Tour de France Femmes
 Madrid Challenge by La Vuelta
 La Flèche Wallonne Féminine
 Liège–Bastogne–Liège Femmes
 Paris–Roubaix Femmes

 Amateur & other

 Tour de l'Avenir
 Shanghai Criterium
 Saitama Critérium

Former

 Critérium International
 Tour of Beijing
 Tour of California
 Tour de Yorkshire / Women's Tour de Yorkshire
 La Course by Le Tour de France
 Tour de Picardie
 Tour of Qatar / Ladies Tour of Qatar
 World Ports Classic

Golf

 Lacoste Ladies Open de France
 Le Vaudreuil Golf Challenge

Motorsports

 Andalucía Rally
 Dakar Rally
 World Rally-Raid Championship

Sailing
 Tour Voile
 Nice Ultimed

Other

Paris Marathon

References

External links
 

Sports organizations of France
Tour de France
Cycle racing in France
Dakar Rally
Sports event promotion companies
Cycling organizations in France